Se non avessi più te is a 1965 Italian "musicarello" film directed by Ettore Maria Fizzarotti.

Cast
Gianni Morandi	as	Gianni Traimonti
Laura Efrikian	as 	Carla Todisco
Anna Maria Polani	as 	Isabel de Villalba
Nino Taranto	as 	Ten. Antonio Todisco
Gino Bramieri	as 	Gino Traimonti
Dolores Palumbo	as	Santina Todisco
Raffaele Pisu	as	Raffaele Traimonti
Enrico Viarisio	as 	The Colonel
Aroldo Tieri	as	Neris
Vittorio Congia	as	Nando Tazza
Stelvio Rosi	as	Giorgio
Nino Terzo	as 	La Bennola
Dino Mele	as 	Ciccio
Carlo Taranto	as 	Sgt. Scannapieco
Daniele Vargas	as	Hotel Manager in Barcelona

External links
 

1965 films
1960s Italian-language films
Musicarelli
Films scored by Ennio Morricone
Films directed by Ettore Maria Fizzarotti
1965 musical comedy films
1960s Italian films